John S. Martin Jr. (born May 31, 1935) is a former United States district judge of the United States District Court for the Southern District of New York.

Education and career

Born in Brooklyn, New York, Martin received a Bachelor of Arts degree from Manhattan College in 1957 and a Bachelor of Laws from Columbia Law School in 1961. He was a law clerk for Judge Leonard P. Moore of the United States Court of Appeals for the Second Circuit from 1961 to 1962. He was an Assistant United States Attorney of the Southern District of New York from 1962 to 1966. He was in private practice in Nyack, New York from 1966 to 1967. He was an Assistant to the Solicitor General of the United States from 1967 to 1969. He was in private practice in New York City from 1969 to 1980. He was the United States Attorney for the Southern District of New York from 1980 to 1983. He was in private practice in New York City from 1983 to 1990.

Federal judicial service

Martin was a United States District Judge of the United States District Court for the Southern District of New York. Martin was nominated by President George H. W. Bush on January 24, 1990, to a seat vacated by Edward Weinfeld. He was confirmed by the United States Senate on April 5, 1990, and received his commission on April 6, 1990. He assumed senior status on May 31, 2003. Martin served in that capacity until September 30, 2003, due to retirement.

References

Sources
FJC Bio

1935 births
Living people
Assistant United States Attorneys
Judges of the United States District Court for the Southern District of New York
Manhattan College alumni
Columbia Law School alumni
United States district court judges appointed by George H. W. Bush
20th-century American judges
United States Attorneys for the Southern District of New York